Westerlee is a village in the Dutch province of Groningen. It is located in the municipality of Oldambt, about 3 km west of the city of Winschoten.

Westerlee was a separate municipality until 1821, when it was merged with Scheemda.

History 
The village was first mentioned in 13th century as Westerle, and means "western burial mound". West has been added to distinguish between Heiligerlee. Westerlee is a road village which developed on the south side of the former Winschoten peninsula.

The Dutch Reformed church was built between 1776 and 1777 as a replacement of the medieval church. The tower has probably been enlarged in the late-19th century.

Westerlee was home to 241 people in 1840.

Gallery

References

External links 
 

Former municipalities of Groningen (province)
Oldambt (municipality)
Populated places in Groningen (province)